The Queer Emporium is an LGBT+ social enterprise and café in Cardiff, Wales. It consists of a collective of over 15 local LGBT+ businesses operating in the same premises.

History 
The Emporium was founded in June 2021, originally as a pop-up shop in the Morgan Arcade for that year's Pride Month. However, after meeting significant success, the shop became permanent.

In March 2022, the Emporium announced that it would be hosting the first Queer Fringe Festival to be held in Cardiff history in Pride Month 2022. Later that month, the Iris Prize announced a partnership with the Emporium to host a series of film screenings, with profits going to Trans Aid Cymru.

In June 2022, the Emporium issued a statement condemning the decision by Cardiff City Council to grant a licence to a Blame Gloria cocktail bar franchise in the location next to the shop, saying that a crowded daytime drinking venue could pose safety concerns to the Emporium's customers. A petition launched by the Emporium against the Council's decision gathered over 3500 signatures.

References

External links 
 

LGBT business organizations
Social enterprises
Business organisations based in Wales
LGBT organisations in Wales